Rest stop is a rest area for motorists.

Rest stop may also refer to:

Rest Stop (film), a 2006 horror film
Rest Stop: Don't Look Back, the 2006 sequel to Rest Stop
"Rest Stop" (short story), a 2003 short story by Stephen King
"Rest Stop", a 2000 song by Matchbox Twenty from Mad Season